The Golden Egg (Dutch: Het Gouden Ei), published as The Vanishing in English-speaking countries, is a psychological thriller novella written by Dutch author Tim Krabbé, first published in 1984. The plot centers on a man whose obsession over the fate of his missing lover from years ago drives him to confront her abductor and pay the ultimate sacrifice in order to know the truth. The book was adapted into a 1988 film which was later remade in an English-language version  by the same director.

Synopsis
Two lovers, Rex Hofman and Saskia Ehlvest, have traveled to France for a bicycling vacation. As a child Saskia had a nightmare in which she became trapped in a golden orb travelling through space indefinitely, with the only hope of escape an infinitesimal chance of eventual intersection with another such orb (the source of the name of the novel). Rex and Saskia argue about Rex's habit of not keeping the fuel tank filled (additionally the car has a broken fuel gauge), and when the car runs out of gas in the middle of a tunnel, Rex leaves Saskia to fetch more. However when he returns she is terrified because her memory of the nightmare has been refreshed. Rex pulls over at a convenience store to refuel. He and Saskia bury coins to mark the spot, Rex agrees to let Saskia drive (which he has never let her do before), and she goes into the station to buy drinks. She is never seen again.

Eight years later, he is still haunted by her disappearance.  He is now in a relationship with another woman named Lieneke, who is both sympathetic to, and frustrated by, the hold that Saskia's disappearance has over him.  Despite her misgivings, however, they become engaged.

At this point the reader is introduced to Raymond Lemorne, the man responsible for whatever happened to Saskia.  The novella reveals that Lemorne once saved a young girl from drowning; having proven to himself that he is capable of great goodness, Raymond then begins to wonder if he is capable of an act of pure evil. He then comes up with an idea to murder someone in the most horrible fashion he can imagine. The book follows his meticulous preparations, and his long months of trying to find a suitable victim. This section of the novella ends with him abducting Saskia, but we are still not told what happens to her, though the book does provide clues.

At this point, the narrative switches back to Rex. His obsession with discovering what happened to Saskia has grown to such an extreme that he has taken out a large loan to post advertisements in papers throughout France, hoping that someone might be able to provide him with information. His quest has also driven a wedge into his relationship with Lieneke. One night he is approached by Lemorne, who reveals that he is the one who abducted Saskia, and in a bizarre show of sympathy, he offers to satisfy Rex's determination to discover her ultimate fate, but only if Rex agrees to undergo the same ordeal that Saskia suffered.

After a long discussion between the two men, Rex agrees to Lemorne's proposal, and proceeds to drink a cup of coffee laced with a sedative. He awakens to find himself buried alive, and suffocates while imagining himself finally to be reunited with Saskia.

In the epilogue it is revealed that several newspapers commented upon Rex's mysterious disappearance and its eerie similarity to Saskia's. Their fates are never discovered; it is as if they vanished from the face of the earth.

Symbology 
An aspect of the symbology used in the novel that is subtle but nevertheless fundamental has to do with petrol itself. After arguing about the fuel in the car, they run out of gas in the tunnel and Saskia's nightmare, which bears similarity to what happens to her when she is murdered by Lemorne, is brought back. When they stop to refuel, it is agreed that Saskia will take the wheel. After she has gone into the gas station but before Rex knows what is transpiring, Rex takes a Polaroid photo (which afterwards becomes significant for Rex to determine what happened). In the moment when Rex sees the photo (which is immediate since it is a Polaroid), the original reads "de foto aan een punt houdend keek hij hoe het TOTAL station en de geparkeerd autos haast of ze even leefden uit de chemicaliën opdoemden" [holding the photo, he watched as the TOTAL station and the parked cars loomed almost alive from the chemicals]. One aspect of the symbology is arguably that while the perpetrator Lemorne is in the sum somewhat banal, the gas station itself exists as a living monster in its own right. Although noticeable in the movie adaptations, this symbology associating evil with petroleum in the novel is more pronounced, and in fact a cover image for the novel features a gas station plaza at night, similar to Rex's photo.

Publishing history
In 1993, an English translation by Claire Nicolas White was released under the title The Vanishing (Random House).  A new English translation of the novel, by Sam Garrett, was published in October 2003 (Bloomsbury).

Dramatisations
The novella was adapted by George Sluizer (from a script by Krabbé) into the award-winning 1988 film Spoorloos (international title: The Vanishing), which starred Bernard-Pierre Donnadieu as Raymond Lemorne, Gene Bervoets as Rex Hofman, Johanna ter Steege in a European Film Award winning performance as Saskia (whose surname was changed to Wagter), and Gwen Eckhaus as Lieneke.

An English-language remake was released in 1993, again directed by Sluizer. This version, which starred Jeff Bridges, Kiefer Sutherland, Nancy Travis, and Sandra Bullock, failed to match the acclaim of the original film, due to an altered ending where Jeff (Rex's counterpart) is rescued and the abductor is killed.

BBC Radio 4 presented an adaptation directed by Kirsty Williams starring Samuel West as part of their Saturday Play series in 2010 – see The Vanishing (radio play).

References 

Thriller novels
20th-century Dutch novels
1984 novels
Novellas
Dutch novels adapted into films
Novels adapted into radio programs
Novels set in France